Santhosh Pandit is an Indian actor, producer, singer, film editor, philanthropist and internet celebrity. He is known for the 2011 low-budget film Krishnanum Radhayum which went viral.

Career 
Pandit's first movie, Krishnanum Radhayum, released on 21 October 2011, became an unexpected crowd puller and saw success in theaters. Some critics attribute the huge success of the film to the complex curiosity after the unprecedented harassment and negative comments posted on the YouTube clips related to the songs in the film. His second film was, Superstar Santhosh Pandit, where he again handled all the major departments in production. like his is first movie, his second movie was a blockbuster in the box-office and with public.

Pandit appeared in the 2013–2014 Malayalam reality tv show Malayalee House aired on Surya TV. The hosts of the show decided to hold a public poll for eviction of housemates from the 5th week onward. Pandit, was eliminated in the 4th week by the housemates. Later the makers of the show admitted that evicting Santhosh Pandit was a mistake. Due to a social media campaign, Santhosh Pandit was returned to the show as a wild-card entry on 7 June 2013. On 19 July 2013 Pandit was again evicted from the show.

Filmography

Television

Controversy
In October 2018, Pandit filed case against actor Suraj Venjaramoodu by claiming that Suraj had made personal insults against him during a channel show of which Suraj was a judge. "Actor Suraj Venjaramoodu was the judge of a comedy programme in which I was insulted. Many fans have asked me to file a complaint against it. But, I didn't get time as I was busy with flood relief activities. I have decided to proceed with legal action against Suraj Venjaramoodu and the crew. Now, the court will decide the right and wrong. Receiving state and national awards is great. But, the most important quality is to be a good human being"; Pandit wrote on facebook.

Awards 
For handling eight departments of the film from direction to acting, Pandit received the 2011 Ekalavya Karma Sreshta Award by Ekalavya Charitable Trust.
He also received the Anand Sankar award for best actor.
In 2017, he received the Raj Kovath lifetime achievement award. He got the best all-rounder of the Malayalam Film Industry Excellency Award in 2019 which was presented to him by M. K. Muneer MLA

References

External links 

Santosh Pandit Hate Groups and Memes: Online Ethnography of Social Media at sarai.net
Santosh Pandit: Negative Publicity and Durablity of the "Superstar of the Poor" at sarai.net

21st-century Indian male actors
Living people
Male actors from Kozhikode
Male actors in Malayalam cinema
Malayalam film directors
Malayalam film producers
Malayalam-language lyricists
Malayalam film score composers
Malayalam playback singers
Non-Malayali Keralites
Film editors from Kerala
Year of birth missing (living people)
Indian male film actors